The HeliWhale Afalina is an ultra-light, coaxial two-seat multipurpose helicopter. The name Afalina comes from the Russian word for "bottlenose dolphin", named for the helicopter's resemblance to the marine mammal.

Specification

References

External links
 

2010s Russian aircraft